Asa is the sixth studio album by the German Viking metal band Falkenbach. It was released in 2013 on Prophecy Productions.

Reception
Yvonne Duchateau of Sonic Seducer, Markus Endres of Metal.de and Filip Van Muylem of Peek-a-Boo Magazine commented that the album combines stylistic elements from Falkenbach's entire career. Duchateau wrote that what is new is the presence of more quiet songs with clear vocals, such as "Eweroun" and "Bluot fuër bluot", which gives a more immediate impression; Endres wrote that "[i]n this tension between Nordic folklore with acoustic guitars and clear vocals, Pagan / Black Metal with sawing riffs, melodic keyboards and harsh voice, Asa comes alive". Van Muylem called the combination of different expressions a "successful amalgamation of tradition without any clichés and fiery passion".

Track listing

Personnel
 Vratyas Vakyas - all instrument, vocals

Additional personnel
 Nikos Mavridis - violin
 Tyrann - vocals
 Hagalaz - guitars
 Boltthorn - drums
 Patrick Damiani - mixing
 Robin Schmidt - mastering
 Albert Bierstadt - artwork
 Costin Chioreanu - layout
 Christophe Szpajdel - logo

References

Falkenbach albums
2013 albums